Beddome's coral snake (Calliophis beddomei) is a species of venomous snake in the family Elapidae. The species is endemic to hills of peninsular India.

Etymology
C. beddomei is named after Richard Henry Beddome (1830-1911), British army officer and naturalist.

Geographic range and habitat
Being first described from the Shevaroy Hills or Yercaud, this species was later known from other parts of the Western Ghats. It is only known from three localities, Koppa, Nilgiri Mountains, and Shevaroy.

Description

Behavior
C. beddomei is terrestrial.

Reproduction
C. beddomei is oviparous.

Threats and conservation
C. beddomei is not considered to be used for commercial use and is not known from any protected areas. However, it is listed in Schedule IV of Wildlife Protection Act, 1972.

References

Further reading
Ganesh, S.R.; Ramanujam, Eric (2014). "Rediscovery of Beddome’s Coralsnake Calliophis beddomei Smith, 1943 from the type locality". Journal of Threatened Taxa 6 (3): 5580–5582.
Sharma, R.C. (2003). Handbook: Indian Snakes. Kolkata: Zoological Survey of India. 292 pp. .
Slowinski, Joseph B.; Boundy, Jeff; Lawson, Robin (2001). "The phylogenetic relationships of Asian coral snakes (Elapidae: Calliophis and Maticora) based on morphological and molecular characters". Herpetologica 57 (2): 233-245.
Smith, Malcolm Arthur (1943). The Fauna of British India, Ceylon and Burma, Including the Whole of the Indo-Chinese Sub-region. Reptilia and Amphibia. Vol. III.—Serpentes. London: Secretary of State for India. (Taylor and Francis, printers). xxii + 583 pp. (Callophis [sic] beddomei, new species, p. 423).

Calliophis
Reptiles of India
Endemic fauna of the Western Ghats
Reptiles described in 1943